Gomułka may refer to:
 Stanisław Gomułka (born 1940), a Polish economist
 Władysław Gomułka (1905–1982), Polish communist leader
 Zofia Gomułka (1902–1986), communist activist, wife of Władysław Gomułka 
 Gomułka thaw or Polish October, transitional period in Polish political history
 SŽ Class 311, Polish-built EMU trainsets, nicknamed after the Polish communist leader

See also 
 Mikołaj Gomółka, 16th century Polish composer
Lenny Gomulka, American musician
Alfred Gomolka, German politician

Polish-language surnames